The 2018–19 First Professional Football League was the 95th season of the top division of the Bulgarian football league system, the 71st since a league format was adopted for the national competition of A Group as a top tier of the pyramid and also the 3rd season of the First Professional Football League, which decides the Bulgarian champion. The season began on 20 July 2018 and finished on 30 May 2019. Ludogorets Razgrad became champions for the 8th consecutive time, on the final matchday of the season, with a 4–1 home win over Cherno More Varna.

Teams
Fourteen teams are competing in the league – the top thirteen teams from the previous season, and one team promoted from the Second League.

Botev Vratsa were promoted as champions of the 2017–18 Second League. The promoted club replaced Pirin Blagoevgrad, who were relegated after elimination in the relegation play-offs by Vitosha Bistritsa. Botev Vratsa return to the top tier after a 5-year absence, while Pirin Blagoevgrad ended a 3-year stay in the top flight.

Stadia and locations

Personnel and sponsorship
Note: Flags indicate national team as has been defined under FIFA eligibility rules. Players and managers may hold more than one non-FIFA nationality.

Note: Individual clubs may wear jerseys with advertising. However, only one sponsorship is permitted per jersey for official tournaments organised by UEFA in addition to that of the kit manufacturer (exceptions are made for non-profit organisations).
Clubs in the domestic league can have more than one sponsorship per jersey which can feature on the front of the shirt, incorporated with the main sponsor or in place of it; or on the back, either below the squad number or on the collar area. Shorts also have space available for advertisement.

Managerial changes

1.No license for First League.

Regular season

League table

Results

Positions by round

Results by round

Championship round
Points and goals will carry over in full from regular season.

Positions by round
Below the positions per round are shown. As teams did not all start with an equal number of points, the initial pre-playoffs positions are also given.

Relegation round
Points and goals will carry over in full from regular season.

Group A

Group B

European play-offs

Bracket

European play-off quarter-finals

European play-off semi-finals

European play-off final

Relegation play-offs

Bracket

Winners of matches 3, 5 and 6 will play in the top division next season

First round

Second round

Vereya are relegated to the Second League.

Third round

Septemvri Sofia are relegated to the Second League.

Season statistics

Top scorers

Hat-tricks

Clean sheets

Transfers
 List of Bulgarian football transfers summer 2018
 List of Bulgarian football transfers winter 2018–19

References

2018-19
Bul
1